White City-Qu'appelle is a provincial electoral district for the Legislative Assembly of Saskatchewan, Canada.

The riding was created by redistribution in 2022, taking territory from Regina Wascana Plains and Indian Head-Milestone. It will be formally contested in the 30th Saskatchewan general election. It is named after the town of White City and the Qu'Appelle River, which forms the northern boundary of the riding. The riding is largely exurban in character, and shares its western boundary with the city of Regina. It also contains three First Nations: Muscowpetung, Pasqua, and Piapot.

Election results

References

Saskatchewan provincial electoral districts